is a Japanese footballer who plays as a centre back for Cerezo Osaka.

Playing career
Nishio was born in Osaka Prefecture on 16 May 2001. He joined J1 League club Cerezo Osaka from youth team in 2018.

References

External links

2001 births
Living people
Association football people from Osaka Prefecture
Japanese footballers
Japan youth international footballers
J1 League players
J3 League players
Cerezo Osaka players
Cerezo Osaka U-23 players
Association football defenders